Kanthanathaswamy Temple, is a Siva temple in Erakaram, near Swamimalai in Thanjavur District in Tamil Nadu. It is at a distance of 8 km from Kumbakonam.

Vaippu Sthalam
It is one of the shrines of the Vaippu Sthalams sung by Tamil Saivite Nayanar Appar.

Presiding deity
The presiding deity is known as Kanthanathaswamy and Sankaranathar. His consort is known as Sankaranayaki.

Location
It is situated at a distance of 3 km from Yanaiyadi near Melacauvery in Kumbakonam-Swamimalai.

References

Hindu temples in Thanjavur district
Shiva temples in Thanjavur district